Paul Eric Worrilow (born May 1, 1990) is a former American football linebacker. He played college football for the University of Delaware where he was recognized as an All-American, and became one of the program's most decorated athletes. The Atlanta Falcons signed him as an undrafted free agent following the 2013 NFL Draft.

Early life
Worrilow is the second youngest of four boys. His mother was born in Wallingford, Connecticut and his father was born in Chester, Pennsylvania.

College career 
Worrilow was not highly recruited after graduation and was only able to solidify offers from Division II schools. Instead of taking any offers, Worrilow moved to Coffeyville, Kansas, where he attended Coffeyville Community College, a junior college known for funneling athletes into Division I football programs. Worrilow was redshirted his first year due to a defensive scheme change, and ultimately turned down interest from the Arkansas Razorbacks to return to Delaware in the spring of 2008 and walk on the Blue Hens football squad.

Worrilow immediately drew attention during his first spring at Delaware, earning a starting spot the following fall as a redshirt freshman along with a team scholarship as a walk-on. Starting every game he played, Worrilow would eventually become team co-captain as a junior, and remain as captain through his senior year, racking up a University of Delaware fifth all-time high 377 career tackles and earning a spot on both the Phil Steele and Sports Network All-American teams. Additionally, Worrilow earned the MVP award for the 2012 season and the prestigious 2013 Edgar Johnson award for exhibiting qualities of hard work, dedication, leadership, fairness, and striving for excellence.

Notable performances include two-time consecutive fumble recoveries for touchdowns (a current Delaware record), a career-record 18 tackles in the Route 1 Rivalry game against Delaware State, which earned him the College Sports Madness CAA Defensive Player of the Week, Beyond Sports Network Defensive All-Star and the Nate Beasley Game MVP Award, and a 38-stop run through the four-game 2010 FCS playoffs, leading the Blue Hens to the 2010 NCAA Division I Football Championship in Frisco, Texas, where they lost 20-19 in a match to Eastern Washington.

College awards and honors 

 2013 Edgar Johnson Award Winner
 2012 University of Delaware Football Season MVP
 3rd team The Sports Network All-American
 1st team All-Colonial Athletic Association 
 Honorable Mention, College Sports Journal All-American
 1st team All-ECAC (All-East)
 Colonial Athletic Association Defensive Player of the Week (Sept. 9; Sept. 23) 
 Beyond Sports Network Defensive All-Star (Delaware State)
 Colonial Athletic Association Chuck Boone Leadership Award Nominee
 Nate Beasley Game MVP Award (Delaware State)
 Blue Hen Touchdown Club Outstanding Senior on Defense Award
 Blue Hen Touchdown Club Captain's Award
 Blue Hen Touchdown Club Baker Taylor Award
 College Sports Madness CAA Defensive Player of the Week (Delaware State)
 Texas vs The Nation All-Star Game Participant

Professional career

Atlanta Falcons
Worrilow was signed as a free agent after the 2013 NFL Draft by the Atlanta Falcons eventually making the final 53-man roster for the 2013 season. After spending a few weeks as the team's backup middle linebacker, Worrilow moved into the starting strongside linebacker position. On a November 3, 2013, loss against the Carolina Panthers, Worrilow recorded a career-high 19 tackles, tying his previous week's performance and a franchise record for most tackles in a game since 1994.

Worrilow ended the 2013 NFL season as the Falcons' leading tackler, landing him a spot on Mel Kiper, Jr.'s All-Rookie Team alongside teammate and fellow rookie Desmond Trufant.

Worrilow ended the 2014 NFL season again leading the Falcons in tackles at 143 tackles (84 solo), two sacks, two forced fumbles, three passes deflected.

In February 2014, Worrilow received the John J. Brady Delaware Athlete of the Year Award from the Delaware Sportswriters and Broadcasters Association.

Worrilow ended the 2015 NFL season again leading the Falcons in tackles at 95 tackles (67 solo), one forced fumble, one fumble recovery, two interceptions, four passes deflected.

In the 2016 season, Worrilow and the Falcons reached Super Bowl LI, where they faced the New England Patriots on February 5, 2017. In the Super Bowl, the Falcons fell in a 34–28 overtime defeat.

Detroit Lions
On March 10, 2017, Worrilow signed with the Detroit Lions. Worrilow recovered a muffed punt in a Week 17 matchup against the Green Bay Packers.

Philadelphia Eagles
On April 3, 2018, Worrilow signed with the Philadelphia Eagles. On May 22, 2018, Worrilow tore his ACL on the first day of OTAs, ending his season. He was officially placed on injured reserve on June 13, 2018.

On January 30, 2019, Worrilow signed a one-year contract extension with the Eagles. He was released on August 18, 2019.

Baltimore Ravens
Worrilow signed with the Baltimore Ravens on August 23, 2019. He requested his release from the team the next day to decide his future in the NFL. He worked out for the Eagles on September 10 and October 8, 2019, and for the New York Jets on November 1, 2019.

New York Jets
On November 5, 2019, Worrilow was signed by the New York Jets.

On September 16, 2020, Worrilow was signed to the New York Jets practice squad, but was released on September 22.

Personal life 
His oldest brother Edward, a marketing professional and accomplished pianist, also graduated from the University of Delaware. His older brother Mark played in the Aztec Bowl in 2009 and was captain of the Division III Ursinus Bears football team, where his younger brother James also competed as a defensive lineman. Worrilow trained throughout his childhood at the Stay Real Football Camp in Wilmington, Delaware. Worrilow attended Concord High School in Wilmington, Delaware where he led the Concord Raiders to the 2006 state Division II title and a berth in the state semifinals in 2005 and 2007. Worrilow made the 2006 First Team All-State on both offense and defense, the 2007 second team All-State as Fullback and first team All-State, and was named Delaware's "2007 Defensive Player of the Year". Despite Worrilow's great success in high school, he was not offered a single scholarship to play NCAA Division I football.

In the spring of 2011, Worrilow discovered he had been matched to a 23-year-old female leukemia patient in need of a life-saving peripheral blood stem cell donation. Worrilow had two-years-prior signed up for the National Marrow Donor Program, through which the chances of becoming a donor are 2/10ths of 1 percent. In the five days leading up to the procedure, Worrilow underwent a series of injections of a drug called filgrastim to increase the number of blood-forming cells in his bloodstream. On May 25, 2011, over the course of 6 hours, Worrilow's blood was then removed through a needle in one arm and passed through a machine that separates out the blood-forming cells, returning it back through a vein in his other arm. Worrilow has yet to meet the woman who received his donation.

On July 5, 2014, Worrilow married his longtime girlfriend. They had their first child together in May 2015.

References

External links
 Atlanta Falcons bio

1990 births
Living people
Players of American football from Wilmington, Delaware
American football linebackers
Delaware Fightin' Blue Hens football players
Atlanta Falcons players
Detroit Lions players
Philadelphia Eagles players
Baltimore Ravens players
New York Jets players